Udayan Vihar is a locality in Guwahati, surrounded by localities of Satgaon, Narengi and Noonmati.

Transport
Locality is connected to rest of city, with regular buses and other modes of transportation.

See also
 Suagpur
 Srihati
 Soniadi
 Soneswar
 Sonai Kamalajari

References

Neighbourhoods in Guwahati